Bennie Brazell (born June 2, 1982) is a former American football wide receiver. He was drafted by the Cincinnati Bengals in the seventh round of the 2006 NFL Draft. He played college football at Louisiana State University.

In 2011, Brazell became the LSU Tigers track and field sprints and hurdles assistant coach.

College career
Brazell went to college at Louisiana State University where he was a member of the football team as well as the indoor and outdoor track and field teams. At LSU he played on the 2003 football national championship team and he was a 14 time All-American. Brazell was a football and track and field teammate of Xavier Carter while at LSU.

Track and field
Brazell was a 2004 Olympic Games finalist in the 400 meter hurdles. His career best time was 47.67 seconds, achieved in June 2005 in Sacramento. He was a five-time track and field national champion. He was also the 2002 SEC Male Track & Field Freshman of the Year.

Personal bests

Professional career

Football
2006 Florida Pro Day

2006 NFL DraftBrazell was drafted by the Cincinnati Bengals in the seventh round of the 2006 NFL Draft.

2006 seasonHe was on the injured reserve list for the 2006 season.

2007 seasonHe failed to make the 53 man roster for the 2007 season.

2008 seasonIn 2008, Brazell tried out for the Jacksonville Jaguars but was not offered a contract.

2010 seasonIn 2010, Brazell played for the Florida Tuskers of the United Football League (UFL).

Rugby
In 2010, Brazell was added to the roster of the USA Rugby Sevens squad.  His first match was in the tour to Fiji.

Coaching career
In 2011, Brazell became the men's sprints and hurdles assistant coach for the LSU Tigers track and field team.

Personal
Brazell is a former student at Westbury High School in Houston, Texas. His Brother, Floyd Anthony Johns Jr, is an action film American stuntman.

References

External links
LSUSports.net Football Bio
LSUSports.net Track & Field Bio 

1982 births
Living people
People from Houston
American rugby union players
American football wide receivers
LSU Tigers football players
LSU Tigers track and field athletes
Cincinnati Bengals players
Florida Tuskers players
LSU Tigers and Lady Tigers track and field coaches
American male hurdlers
Athletes (track and field) at the 2004 Summer Olympics
Olympic track and field athletes of the United States
Rugby union players that played in the NFL